The Derry Senior Football Championship is an annual Gaelic football competition contested by the top sixteen Derry GAA clubs. The winners receive the John McLaughlin Cup and qualify to represent Derry in the Ulster Senior Club Football Championship.

Glen are the title holders (2022) and back-to-back champions defeating Slaughtneil in the Final to win their second title on 23rd October 2022.

History
Bellaghy have won the competition more than any other club with 21 titles. Bellaghy's Tom Scullion has more senior football championship medals than anyone in Derry, winning 12 medals between 1956 and 1971.

Bellaghy and Slaughtneil are the only teams to have won four consecutive titles. As well as the four-in-a-row, Bellaghy have also won three consecutive titles on two other separate occasions. Ballinderry have also won three consecutive titles on two separate occasions.

Format

Current format

In 2016, the championship reverted to its traditional knock-out format. All fixtures are determined by open-draw and are played at neutral venues. The majority of games are played at Owenbeg, near Dungiven. The final is usually played at Celtic Park, Derry.

Historical formats

Before 1958, three regional tournaments were played to determine the Derry Senior Football Championship finalists - the South Derry Senior Football Championship, the North Derry Senior Football Championship and the Derry City Senior Football Championship. Of the three winners, one received a bye to the final (in alternating years) and the other two played a semi-final to determine who qualified for the Derry Senior Football Championship final.

From 1958 to 2006 the championship took the form of an open-draw knock-out.

From 2007 to 2008 the championship was altered to include a round-robin group stage with the 16 teams divided into four groups. Each club in a group played each other once with the top two in each group advancing to the quarter-finals. From the quarter-finals onwards the competition was knock-out.

In 2009 a "backdoor" system was introduced -
 The 16 clubs all played in the first round.
 In the second round winners section the eight winning teams from round one played against each other with the four winners going straight into the quarter-finals. In the second round losers section the eight beaten teams from round one played against each other.
 In round three (also referred to as the quarter-final qualifiers) the four beaten teams from the round two winners section played the four winning teams from the round two losers section.
 In the quarter-finals the four teams who won their first two matches in rounds one and two played the four winners of round three.
 The quarter-finals, semi-finals and final were knock-out.

Trophies
The cup for the winners of the Derry Senior Football Championship is named after John McLaughlin, a former leading official in Derry GAA. He was a native of Inishowen in County Donegal, having been born in Fahan. He was for a long time chairman of the North Derry Board and he was elected chairman of the County Board in about 1943 or 1944 in succession to Paddy Larkin, a post he held until his death in 1961. The County Board decided to purchase a new cup and present it to the winners of the Senior Championship in the following year. In 1989 the cup was replaced, but it is still called the John McLaughlin Cup.

 Since 1988 the player who has scored the most in that year's championship is presented with a trophy. 
 Since 1989 the man of the match in the final is also presented with a trophy.

Finals listed by year

Notes
1907 - Éire Óg club is now defunct.
1938 - Pearse's was a Derry City club, now defunct. 
1944 - Mitchel's was a Derry City club, now defunct.

Wins listed by club

Notes
1914 Clan Chonail are a Donegal team.
1916 Sarsfield's are now defunct. They were a Derry City club, a fore-runner to the modern-day Doire Colmcille club.
1930 Buncrana are a Donegal team.
1931 Burt are a Donegal team.

See also
Derry club football competitions

References

External links
Official Derry GAA website
Derry at Hogan Stand
Derry at ClubGAA
County Derry Post / Derry Now

 
Derry GAA club championships
1
Senior Gaelic football county championships